Pokhvistnevo is a town in Samara Oblast, Russia, located on the left bank of the Bolshoy Kinel River (Samara's tributary),  northeast of Samara, Russia and only  from the border with Orenburg Oblast. Population:

History
It was founded in 1888 as a settlement serving the construction of the Samara–Ufa railroad. The present Pokhvistnevo railway station was built here in 1902–1904. Town status was granted to it in 1947.

Administrative and municipal status
Within the framework of administrative divisions, Pokhvistnevo serves as the administrative center of Pokhvistnevsky District, even though it is not a part of it. As an administrative division, it is, together with one rural locality, incorporated separately as the town of oblast significance of Pokhvistnevo—an administrative unit with the status equal to that of the districts. As a municipal division, the town of oblast significance of Pokhvistnevo is incorporated as Pokhvistnevo Urban Okrug.

References

Notes

Sources

Cities and towns in Samara Oblast
Populated places established in 1888